"Strong Love" is a song recorded by Australian pop singer Pat Wilson. The song as written by her husband, Ross Wilson of the bands Daddy Cool and Mondo Rock.

"Strong Love" was released in May 1984. It peaked at number 26 on the Kent Music Report.

Track listing 
7" Vinyl (WEA – )
 "Strong Love" - 3:56
 "Tacky Too" - 3:25

Charts

References

Songs written by Ross Wilson (musician)
1984 singles
1984 songs
Song recordings produced by Ross Wilson (musician)